Pseudocherleria is a genus of flowering plants belonging to the family Caryophyllaceae.

Its native range is Subarctic to Northern China, Turkey to Iran.

Species:

Pseudocherleria aizoides 
Pseudocherleria brotheriana 
Pseudocherleria charadzeae 
Pseudocherleria colchica 
Pseudocherleria imbricata 
Pseudocherleria inamoena 
Pseudocherleria kurilensis 
Pseudocherleria laricina 
Pseudocherleria macrocarpa 
Pseudocherleria pseudoimbricata 
Pseudocherleria rhodocalyx

References

Caryophyllaceae
Caryophyllaceae genera